Sister Marie Elizabeth Roche  is a New Zealand nun who was appointed a Member of the New Zealand Order of Merit in the 2011 Queen's Birthday Honours for services to the community, including for her work over 15 years as Rimutaka Prison's Catholic chaplain.

References

20th-century New Zealand Roman Catholic nuns
Living people
21st-century New Zealand Roman Catholic nuns
Year of birth missing (living people)
Members of the New Zealand Order of Merit